Laís Bodanzky (born 23 September 1969) is a Brazilian film director. She is best known for Brainstorm, a film about the situation in mental institutions in Brazil.

Over 15 years, she has coordinated the educational Tela Brasil social projects, showing movies in low-income areas of Brazil, fostering the Brazilian film industry and bringing over one million people to movie theaters, most for the first time in their lives.

Filmography

References

External links
 

1969 births
Living people
People from São Paulo
Brazilian film directors

Brazilian people of Austrian-Jewish descent